Onychopetalum is a genus of flowering plants belonging to the family Annonaceae.

Its native range is Southern Tropical America.

Species:

Onychopetalum amazonicum 
Onychopetalum periquino

References

Annonaceae
Annonaceae genera